Universe is an album by jazz keyboardist Hampton Hawes recorded for the Prestige label in 1972.

Reception

Scott Yanow of Allmusic states, "In 1972, Hampton Hawes began to fully explore electric keyboards. Although his longtime fans were not happy with the temporary move, Hawes' music at the time was actually more creative than it was often rated... Hawes deserves credit for his willingness to take chances, and even if this album (consisting of seven moody originals) is not as significant as most of his boppish trio dates from the 1950s, it deserves to be reevaluated, for it is better than often thought".

Track listing
All compositions by Hampton Hawes
 "Little Bird" - 1:17   
 "Drums for Peace" - 8:57   
 "Love Is Better" - 2:41   
 "Josie Black" - 8:15   
 "Don't Pass Me By" - 6:53   
 "Universe" - 3:05   
 "J.B.'s Mind" - 9:18

Personnel
Hampton Hawes - piano, electric piano, organ, synthesizer
Oscar Brashear - trumpet
Harold Land - tenor saxophone
Arthur Adams - guitar
Chuck Rainey - electric bass
Ndugu - drums

References

Hampton Hawes albums
1972 albums
Prestige Records albums